Tomoxia anotata is a species of beetle in the genus Tomoxia of the family Mordellidae. It was described by Ray in 1949.

References

Beetles described in 1949
Tomoxia